Cowiea is a genus of flowering plants in the family Rubiaceae. It is found on Borneo and the Philippines

Species
Cowiea borneensis Wernham - Sabah
Cowiea philippinensis Merr. - Philippines

References

External links
Cowiea in the World Checklist of Rubiaceae

Rubiaceae genera
Octotropideae
Taxa named by Herbert Fuller Wernham